Vitali Alyaksandravich Parakhonka (born 18 August 1993) is a Belarusian athlete specialising in the sprint hurdles. He represented his country at the 2018 World Indoor Championships reaching the semifinals.

In 2019, he won the silver medal in the team event at the 2019 European Games held in Minsk, Belarus.

His personal bests are 13.40 seconds in the 110 metres hurdles (-1.0 m/s, Minsk 2018) and 7.70 seconds in the 60 metres hurdles (Mogilyov 2018).

International competitions

References

1993 births
Living people
Belarusian male hurdlers
Athletes (track and field) at the 2019 European Games
European Games medalists in athletics
European Games silver medalists for Belarus
People from Orsha
Athletes (track and field) at the 2020 Summer Olympics
Olympic athletes of Belarus
Sportspeople from Vitebsk Region